Dial-108, or one-zero-eight is a free telephone number for emergency services in India. It is currently operational in 18 states (Andhra Pradesh, Assam, Chhattisgarh, Goa, Gujarat, Himachal Pradesh, Karnataka, Kerala, Madhya Pradesh, Maharashtra, Meghalaya, Odisha, Punjab, Rajasthan, Tamil Nadu, Telangana, Uttarakhand, Jharkhand, Sikkim and Uttar Pradesh) and two Union Territories (Dadra & Nagar Haveli and Daman & Diu). The 108 Emergency Response Service is a free emergency service providing integrated medical, police and fire emergency services. Government of Andhra Pradesh in Public Private Partnership with GVK EMRI launched the 108 Emergency Response Service on 15 August 2005 (GVK Press Release). This system was introduced nationwide by former Union Health Minister, Dr. Anbumani Ramadoss.In Madhya Pradesh. The service is a public-private partnership between state governments and private EMS providers. This 108 service was rolled out initially by Ramalinga Raju and his family in August 2005. It was initially a private funded initiative, but later signed MOUs with multiple state governments from August 2007. In 2007, Chief minister Narendra Modi launched these services in Gujarat on 29 August 2007. With the life-saving service becoming so popular in the rural parts of combined Andhra Pradesh, the (108) system was later introduced by the Central government of India in other parts of India. The system was originally designed by Satyam Infotech. , this service had handled over 540,000 emergency cases in India. From year 2017 to 2022, 108 service in Jharkhand is operated by Ziqitza Healthcare Limited.  On an iOS device, "Hey Siri, 108" command to Siri will place an emergency call.

History
108 is the toll free number for an initiative called emergency management and research institute. It was launched by Satyam Ramalingaraju and family in 2005 in Hyderabad. The existing independent emergency services (100 for police, 101 for fire and 102 for ambulance)  worked erratically and independently of each other. Ramalingaraju wanted to integrate these services and launched 108 to provide quicker response for the emergencies. Apart from Ramalingaraju, G Venkata Krishna Reddy was the major contributor for implementing these services . Dr. A.P. Ranga Rao, has designed 108 EMRI service.  In parallel to 108, Central government funded  "Referential Transport System" was initiated under National Rural Health Mission. In Andhra pradesh Referential Transport system was supported through different NGOs from 2005 as PPP model. After Very first PPP model through tendering process in India was started in the Year 2007, Ziqitza Healthcare Limited was operating in Bihar from 2009 to 2019. RTS ambulance was slowly being implemented across the country  and in Andhra Pradesh, it was implemented in 4 districts.  To expand RTS ambulance service to other districts,  Late Chief Minister of Andhra Pradesh Dr. Y.S.Rajasekhara Reddy has signed an MOU to utilize the Central government funds with the help of EMRI in 2007. EMRI has subsequently made similar kind of deal with other states nationwide. The previously existing 102 emergency service is now being used explicitly for pregnancy related emergencies.

Scope
The Dial-108 service is available in the Indian states of Andhra Pradesh, Assam, Chhattisgarh, Goa, Gujarat, Himachal Pradesh, Haryana, Karnataka, Kerala, Madhya Pradesh, Maharashtra, Meghalaya, Odisha, Punjab, Rajasthan, Tamil Nadu, Telangana, Uttarakhand, Sikkim, Jharkhand, and Uttar Pradesh, and two union territories; Puducherry, Daman and Diu, and Chandigarh.

How it works
When an emergency is reported, the call taker at the Emergency Response Centre (ERC) gathers the needed information, including location, and dispatches appropriate emergency services; be that an ambulance, police assistance, or a fire engine.

Emergency help dispatched through this process is expected to reach the location of the emergency in an average of 18 minutes.  Pre-hospital care will be given to patients during transit to hospital.  Patients are transported in ambulances well equipped to handle emergency situations.  Road and water ambulances are the two types of ambulances commonly used in India to transport patients. Two type of ambulances are Advanced Life support (ALS) and Basic Life support (BLS). Road ambulances are used across all its states.  However, only a few states, namely Odisha, Assam, and Gujarat, along with two Union Territories, have been using boat ambulances. Odisha was the first state to launch the boat ambulance by Ziqitza Healthcare Limited (ZHL) for remote areas.

At present, there are only three providers: GVK Emergency Management and Research Institute (GVK EMRI), Ziqitza Healthcare Limited (ZHL), and Bharat Vikas Group India-UK Specialist Ambulance Services (BVG-UKSAS) who operate Dial-108 in Emergency in public private partnership with state governments.  The service is normally free to patients.

In Maharashtra, Jammu, Kashmir, Dial-108, and in JK in addition to Dial-108, Dial-102 ambulance services are being run by BVG India Ltd.  Dial-102 service is for pregnant women and child.  BVG India Ltd chairman and MD is Mr. Hanmantrao Gaikwad.  And EMS CEO is Dr. Dnyaneshwar Shelke.  In Maharashtra, Dial-108 is launched by state government form 2014, this is free service by the Government and is being operated by BVG India Ltd.  It was also operating this service in Andhra Pradesh.  In Madhya Pradesh BVG India also operating Dial-100 police helpline of the state government.

In 2022, Ziqitza Healthcare Limited started operating Dial 112 along with 108 Service, This Dial 112 which is in similar model of 911 model. One can reach to reach out to police, health, fire, and other services by just dialing one helpline number.

Siri prank
In March 2017, the Dial-108 emergency telephone number became the subject of a prank, in which victims would be told to say 108 to Siri, which would in turn command it to dial the respective country's emergency services.

See also
Government of India
102 (ambulance service) – Free Ambulance Service, an emergency medical transport service in India.

Other emergency numbers in India 

 Women Helpline: 1091
 Women Helpline for Domestic Abuse: 181
 Air Ambulance: 9540161344
 Aids Helpline: 1097
 Anti Poison New Delhi: 1066 or 011-1066
 Disaster Management: 011-26701728-1078
 EARTHQUAKE / FLOOD / DISASTER N.D.R.F: 011-24-363-260
 Missing Child And Women: 1094
 Railway Enquiry: 139
 Senior Citizen Helpline: 1091 or 1291
 Railway Accident Emergency Service: 1072
 Road Accident Emergency Service: 1073
 Road Accident Emergency Service On National Highway For Private Operators: 1033
 ORBO Centre, AIIMS (For Donation Of Organ) Delhi: 1060
 Call Centre: 1551
 Relief Commissioner For Natural Calamities: 1070
 Children In Difficult Situation: 1098
 Central Vigilance Commission: 1964
 Tourist Helpline: 1363 or 1800111363
 LPG Leak Helpline: 1906

References

External links

VMEDO Emergency Ambulance Services App 
Indian Helpline

Emergency telephone numbers
Emergency medical services in India
Three-digit telephone numbers